Sardehat-e Sheykh (also Romanized as Sardehāt-e Sheykh; also known as Sardahāt-e Bālā, Sardehāt, Sardehāt-e Sheykhlar, Sardehāt-e Sheykhlū, Sardehāt Sheykhestānlū, and Sardekhat) is a village in Zanjanrud-e Pain Rural District, Zanjanrud District, Zanjan County, Zanjan Province, Iran. At the 2006 census, its population was 219, in 60 families.

References 

Populated places in Zanjan County